Neumünster station is the main railway station of the town of Neumünster in the German state of Schleswig-Holstein. It is at the junction of lines to Flensburg, Heide, Hamburg-Altona,  Kiel, Bad Oldesloe, Kaltenkirchen and until 1985 Ascheberg. It is currently operated by Deutsche Bahn, which classifies it as a category 2 station.

History 
The station was opened in 1844 by the Altona-Kiel Railway Company (AKE) during the construction of the first railway line in Schleswig-Holstein, which connected Kiel with Altona. Soon, more lines were added: in 1845 the route to Rendsburg was opened by the Rendsburg-Neumünster Railway Company (Rendsburg-Neumünstersche Eisenbahn). In 1866 the AKE opened its line to Ascheberg and on to Neustadt in Holstein (part of which is now incorporated in the Kiel–Lübeck line) and in 1875 it opened its line to Bad Oldesloe. Finally in 1877 the line to and from Heide was opened by the West Holstein Railway Company (Westholsteinische Eisenbahn-Gesellschaft). The AKN Railway reached Neumünster in 1916, but at first its trains terminated in Neumünster-Süd station.

The original station building was demolished in 1974 and replaced by a modern building.

In September 1985 the line from Neumünster to Ascheberg was closed to passenger traffic. In November 1995, freight traffic on the line was also officially closed.

Since 2009, some modernisation has been carried out at the station. Thus, the passenger information systems have been replaced. Facilities on the platforms have been modernised and lifts to the platforms have been replaced.

More recent modernisation includes provision of automatic ticket machines. However if you need help with your ticket purchase and/or need to use the DB ticket office, it is not situated in the Station building but in Rendsburger Strasse over the road from the station. A sign by DB to explain this to passengers is needed.

Operations 

In long-distance traffic ICE, EC and IC run on the roads from Hamburg to Kiel und Flensburg. Services which are no longer offered include ICE services to/from Copenhagen/Berlin Ostbahnhof and CNL services to/from Kopenhagen/Amsterdam.

Regional Transport 
The following regional services serve the station:

(as of 2019)

Tracks 
The station has six tracks that are used in passenger transport. Normally they are used as follows:
Platform track 1: trains to and from Bad Oldesloe.
 Platform track 2: trains to and from Kaltenkirchen–Hamburg-Eidelstedt.
 Platform tracks 3, 4 and 5: trains to and from Hamburg, Kiel and Flensburg.
 Platform track 6: trains operate to and from Heide–Büsum.

Notes

External links 
 

Railway stations in Schleswig-Holstein
Neumünster
Railway stations in Germany opened in 1844